Nurzhan is a given name of Kazakh origin, meaning "light soul". Notable people with the given name include:

Nurzhan Karimzhanov (born 1980), Kazakhstani boxer
Nurzhan Kermenbayev (born 1989), Kazakh singer
Nurzhan Smanov (born 1972), Kazakhstani retired boxer